Humbert II de la Tour-du-Pin (1312 – 4 May 1355) was the Dauphin of the Viennois from 1333 to 16 July 1349. Humbert was the last dauphin before the title went to the French crown, to be bestowed on the heir apparent.

Character
Humbert was a son of Dauphin John II of Viennois and Beatrice of Hungary. To contemporaries, he was incompetent and extravagant, lacking the warlike ardour of his brother. He passed his youth at Naples enjoying the aesthetic pleasures of the Italian trecento. His subsequent court at Beauvoir-en-Royans had a reputation for extravagance.  Unlike his predecessors, Humbert was not itinerant, moving continually from one dauphinal castle to another, instead preferring to settle in Beauvoir. He depleted his treasury rather than institute oppressive taxes.

War and politics 
When Humbert inherited the Dauphiné on the death of his brother Guigues VIII in 1333, they were at war with Aymon, Count of Savoy.  Within a year, King Philip VI of France was able to broker a truce between the new dauphin and Savoy. In 1333, Louis IV, Holy Roman Emperor, sought to counter French influence in the region, and offered Humbert the Kingdom of Arles, an opportunity to gain full authority over Savoy, Provence, and surrounding territories.  Humbert was reluctant to take the crown and the conflict that would follow with all around him, so he declined. Subsequently, Humbert found himself more and more financially dependent on Philip.

Humbert was married to Marie of Baux, niece of King Robert of Naples by his sister Beatrice. Humbert's only son, Andrew, died aged two in October 1335. By 1337 Humbert was planning to cede his inheritance.  He first offered it to Robert, who did not like the terms.  In 1339 due to increasing financial difficulties, he made an inventory of his possessions with the hope of selling them to Pope Benedict XII.

In May 1345, Humbert left Marseille leading a papal fleet called by Pope Clement VI. The Second Smyrniote Crusade was against the Aydınids. It was intended to assist the recaptured Frankish port of Smyrna by responding to a January 1345 attack during a time of truce by the Turkish garrison upon Christians worshiping in the demolished cathedral. While at sail his fleet was attacked by the Genoa near Rhodes. He was also asked to intervene by Venice in the conflict between Bartolomeo Zaccaria and Guglielma Pallavicini over the marquisate of Bodonitsa. Humbert's battle for control of Smyrna in 1346 led to 55 years of Christian rule over the city. During his command, he established the confraternal Order of Saint Catherine. 

Humbert's wife died around the start of 1347, shortly before he returned from the crusade. As he was returning, he joined marquesses John II of Montferrat and Thomas II of Saluzzo in their fight against Robert's successor, Queen Joanna I of Naples, who was supported by the Savoyards.  When Pope Clement VI brought the two sides to negotiations, the terms included the possibility of Humbert marrying Bianca of Savoy, though this did not reach agreement.

The planned sale to the pope falling through, Humbert finally succeeded in completing a sale to King Philip VI of France in 1349 for 400,000 écus and an annual pension. To maintain its sovereignty, however, the sale was referred to as a "transfer".  In order to prevent the title from going into abeyance or being swallowed up in another sovereign title, Humbert instituted the "Delphinal Statute" whereby the Dauphiné was exempted from many taxes and imposts. This statute was subject to much parliamentary debate at regional level, as local leaders sought to defend their autonomy and privilege against the state.

Ecclesiastical career 

After ceding his lands, Humbert entered the Dominican Order and became Latin Patriarch of Alexandria within two years. He consecrated Rodolphe de Chissé as Bishop of Grenoble in 1351.  It is with these latter titles that his death is recorded in a necrology of Vauvert: in Clermont-en-Auvergne, at 43 years of age in 1355. He was buried in the now demolished church of Couvent des Jacobins in Paris.

Notes

References
 
 

Setton, The Papacy and the Levant (1204–1571), vol. 1 (Philadelphia, 1976), Chapter 10,‘Clement VI, Humbert and end of the crusade to Smyrna, 1345-52’, pp. 195–223.
Miller, W. "The Marquisate of Boudonitza (1204–1414)." Journal of Hellenic Studies, Vol. 28, 1908, pp 234–249.

1312 births
1355 deaths
Dauphins of Viennois
Christians of the Crusades
French Dominicans
Latin Patriarchs of Alexandria
Archbishops of Reims
14th-century French Roman Catholic bishops
14th-century peers of France
Smyrniote crusades